Babesia sp. 'North Carolina dog'  is an unclassified species of Babesia, identified from a 18S ribosomal gene partial sequence performed in the investigation of dog piroplasms.

Unlike the other piroplasms investigated, the piroplasm is "in a distinct phylogenetic clade, closely related to babesial isolates from wildlife and humans from the Western US".

References

North Carolina dog
Undescribed species